EIEC may refer to:
Enteroinvasive Escherichia coli, a bacterium
Encyclopedia of Indo-European Culture, an encyclopedia